Several French ships have held the name Sphinx:

 , a third-rate ship of the line, 64 guns, launched 1756 at Brest, fought in the Seven Years' War, scrapped 1775 in Brest
 , third-rate ship of the line, 64 guns, launched 1776 in Brest, fought in the American Revolutionary War
 , sixth-rate ship, captured from the British on 10 September 1779, recaptured by the British on 29 December 1779, broken up 1811
 , brig, launched in Genoa in 1813
 , launched 1829, first steamship in the French Navy

French Navy ship names